The 2014 Alabama Crimson Tide baseball team represents the University of Alabama in the 2014 NCAA Division I baseball season. The Crimson Tide play their home games in Sewell-Thomas Stadium.

Personnel

Returning starters

Roster

2014 Alabama Crimson Tide Baseball Roster

Coaching staff

Schedule and results

! style="background:#ffffff; color:#9e1b32;" | Regular Season: 34–21
|- valign="top" 

|- align="center" bgcolor="#ffdddd"
| February 14 ||  || No. 29 || Sewell-Thomas Stadium || L 1–2 || N. Bates (1–0) ||T. Hawley (0–1) || M. Eckelman (1) || 2,601  || 0–1 || –
|- align="center" bgcolor="#ddffdd"
| February 15 || Saint Louis || No. 29 ||  Sewell-Thomas Stadium || W 4–3 || T. Burrows (1–0) || D. Rivera (0–1)|| None || 3,242  || 1–1 || –
|- align="center" bgcolor="#ddffdd"
| February 16 || Saint Louis  || No. 29 ||  Sewell-Thomas Stadium || W 9–3 || J. Keller (1–0) || Z. Girrens (0–1)|| None || 3,231  ||2–1 || –
|- align="center" bgcolor="#ffdddd"
| February 21 || Stephen F. Austin || No. 28 || Sewell-Thomas Stadium || L 1–2(13) || T. Wiedenfeld (1–0) ||J. Shaw (0–1) || P. Ledet (1) || 3,996  || 2–2 || –
|- align="center" bgcolor="#ddffdd"
| February 22 || Stephen F. Austin || No. 28 ||  Sewell-Thomas Stadium || W 8–0 || J. Kamplain (1–0) || K. Cross (0–2)|| None || 3,816  || 3–2 || –
|- align="center" bgcolor="#ddffdd"
| February 23 || Stephen F. Austin|| No. 28 ||  Sewell-Thomas Stadium|| W 3–2(10) || J. Keller (2–0) || K. Bishop (0–2)|| None || 3,337  ||4–2 || –
|- align="center" bgcolor="#ffdddd"
| February 26 || ||  ||  Pete Taylor Park || L 1–2 || J. Myrick (1–1) ||T. Guilbeau (0–1) || B. Roney (2) || 3,491  || 4–3 || –
|- align="center" bgcolor="#ffdddd"
| February 28 || No. 13 Louisiana–Lafayette ||  ||  M. L. Tigue Moore Field || L 0–2 || A. Robichaux (2–1) ||S. Turnbull (0–1) || None || 4,040  || 4–4 || –
|-

|- align="center" bgcolor="#ffdddd"
| March 1|| No. 13 Louisiana–Lafayette ||  ||  M. L. Tigue Moore Field || L 0–6 || C. Baranik (2–0) ||J. Kamplain (1–1) || None || 4,004  || 4–5 || –
|- align="center" bgcolor="#ddffdd"
| March 2 || No. 13 Louisiana–Lafayette ||  || M. L. Tigue Moore Field|| W 12–6 || J. Keller (3–0) || G. Milhorn (2–1)|| None || 4,031  ||5–5 || –
|- align="center" bgcolor="#ddffdd"
| March 4† ||  ||  ||  Riverwalk Stadium || W 4–3 ||  T. Burrows (2–0) || T. Dedrick (0–2)|| None || 6,141  || 6–5 || –
|- align="center" bgcolor="#ddffdd"
| March 7 ||  ||  ||  Sewell-Thomas Stadium || W 8–0 ||  S. Turnbull (1–1) || C. Sheppeard (0–4)|| None || 3,982  || 7–5 || –
|- align="center" bgcolor="#ddffdd"
| March 8|| MS Valley State||  ||  Sewell-Thomas Stadium || W 7–0 || J. Kamplain (2–1) || J. Parker (0–3)|| None || 4,139  || 8–5 || –
|- align="center" bgcolor="#ddffdd"
| March 9 || MS Valley State ||  ||  Sewell-Thomas Stadium || W 3–0 || J. Keller (4–0) || B. McBride (0–1)|| K. Overstreet (1)|| 3,109  ||9–5 || –
|- align="center" bgcolor="#ddffdd"
| March 11 ||  ||  ||  Sewell-Thomas Stadium|| W 12–1 || N. Eicholtz (1–0) || C. Pugh (2–1)|| None|| 2,820 ||10–5 || –
|- align="center" bgcolor="#ddffdd"
| March 14 || No. 21  Kentucky ||  ||  Sewell-Thomas Stadium || W 3–0 ||  S. Turnbull (2–1) || A. Reed (3–1)|| T. Burrows (1)|| 4,258  || 11–5 || 1–0
|- align="center" bgcolor="#ffdddd"
| March 15 || No. 21 Kentucky ||  || Sewell-Thomas Stadium || L 2–7 || C. Shepherd (4–0) ||J. Kamplain (2–2) || None || – || 11–6 || 1–1
|- align="center" bgcolor="#ddffdd"
| March 15 || No. 21 Kentucky ||  || Sewell-Thomas Stadium || W 5–3(10) ||  T. Burrows (3–0) || L. Salow (1–1)|| None || 4,142  || 12–6 || 2–1
|- align="center" bgcolor="#ddffdd"
| March 18 ||  || No. 28 || Sewell-Thomas Stadium || W 17–3 ||  G. Bramblett (1–0) || J. Vasquez (0–1)|| None|| 2,554  || 13–6 || –
|- align="center" bgcolor="#ddffdd"
| March 19 || Alcorn State || No. 28 || Sewell-Thomas Stadium || W 12–0 ||  T. Hawley (1–1) || J. Lemond (0–1)|| None|| 2,524  || 14–6 || –
|- align="center" bgcolor="#ddffdd"
| March 21 || Arkansas || No. 28 || Baum Stadium ||17–9 ||  J. Shaw (1–1) || Z. Jackson (1–1)|| None|| 8,112 || 15–6 || 3–1
|- align="center" bgcolor="#ffdddd"
| March 22 || Arkansas|| No. 28 || Baum Stadium || L 1–2 ||  T. Killian (1–3) || T. Burrows (3–1)|| None|| 9,036 || 15–7 || 3–2
|- align="center" bgcolor="#ffdddd"
| March 23 || Arkansas || No. 28 || Baum Stadium|| L 0–1 ||  C. Oliver (2–2) || J. Keller (4–1)|| M. Gunn (3)|| 7,967 || 15–8 || 3–3
|- align="center" bgcolor="#ddffdd"
| March 25 || ||  || Pensacola Bayfront Stadium || W 10–5 || N. Eicholtz (2–0) || W. Shell (3–2)|| None|| 5,038 ||16–8 || –
|- align="center" bgcolor="#ddffdd"
| March 28 || No. 12 Ole Miss||  || Sewell-Thomas Stadium || W 7–6 ||  S. Turnbull (3–1) || S. Weathersby (1–1)|| T. Burrows (2)|| 4,258  || 17–8 || 4–3
|- align="center" bgcolor="#ddffdd"
| March 29 || No. 12 Ole Miss  ||  || Sewell-Thomas Stadium|| W 6–5(10) ||  G. Bramblett (2–0) || W. Short (3–1)|| None|| 4,001  || 18–8 || 5–3
|- align="center" bgcolor="#ddffdd"
| March 30 || No. 12 Ole Miss ||  || Sewell-Thomas Stadium|| W 3–1 || J. Keller (5–1) || S. Smith (3–2)|| None|| 3,575  ||19–8 || 6–3
|-

|- align="center" bgcolor="#ddffdd"
|April 1 ||Louisiana–Monroe || No. 15 || Sewell-Thomas Stadium || W 3–2 ||  T. Hawley (2–1) || C. Taylor (2–2)|| T. Burrows (3)|| 3,005  || 20–8 || – 
|- align="center" bgcolor="#ddffdd"
|April 4 |||| No. 15 || Olsen Field || W 5–1 ||  S. Turnbull (4–1) || D. Mengden (2–4)|| None|| 4,806  || 21–8 || 7–3
|- align="center" bgcolor="#ffdddd"
|April 5 ||Texas A&M|| No. 15 || Olsen Field || L 7–13 ||  P. Ray (3–2) || J. Shaw (1–2)|| None|| –|| 21–9 || 7–4
|- align="center" bgcolor="#ddffdd"
|April 5 ||Texas A&M || No. 15 || Olsen Field || W 6–4 ||  R. Castillo (1–0) || J. Jester (2–2)|| T. Burrows (4)|| 5,038  || 22–9 || 8–4 
|- align="center" bgcolor="#ffdddd"
|April 8 || || No. 9 || Sewell-Thomas Stadium || L 1–2 ||  A. Lamar (1–0) || J. Shaw (1–3)|| A. Lau (4)|| 2,905|| 22–10 || –
|- align="center" bgcolor="#ffdddd"
|April 11 |||| No. 9 || Sewell-Thomas Stadium|| L 1–2 || D. Ortman (6–2) ||S. Turnbull (4–2) || K. Thompson (1) || 6,069  || 22–11 || 8–5 
|- align="center" bgcolor="#ddffdd"
|April 12 ||Auburn|| No. 9 || Sewell-Thomas Stadium || W 4–1 || J. Kamplain (3–2) ||M. O'Neal  (2–4) || T. Burrows (5) || 6,142 || 23–11 || 9–5
|- align="center" bgcolor="#ddffdd"
|April 13 || Auburn|| No. 9 || Sewell-Thomas Stadium || W 4–3 ||  T. Burrows (4–1) || K. Thompson (5–2)|| None || 4,468  || 24–11 || 10–5
|- align="center" bgcolor="#ddffdd"
|April 15 |||| No. 8 || Sewell-Thomas Stadium || W 8–1 ||  T. Hawley (3–1) || A. Juday (4–3)|| None|| 2,587  || 25–11 || – 
|- align="center" bgcolor="#ddffdd"
|April 16 || || No. 8 || Regions Field || W 5–2 ||  G. Bramblett (3–0) || A. Lamar (1–1)|| T. Burrows (6)|| 3,067  || 26–11|| – 
|- align="center" bgcolor="#ddffdd"
|April 18 |||| No. 8 || Lindsey Nelson Stadium || W 8–5 ||S. Turnbull (5–2) ||N. Williams (4–4) || T. Burrows (7)||  2,018 || 27–11 || 11–5 
|- align="center" bgcolor="#ddffdd"
|April 19 ||Tennessee|| No. 8 || Lindsey Nelson Stadium || W 7–6 || J. Shaw (2–3) || A.Cox (3–1) ||T. Burrows (8)  || 2,670 || 28–11 || 12–5
|- align="center" bgcolor="#ffdddd"
|April 20 ||Tennessee|| No. 8 || Lindsey Nelson Stadium || L 9–10 || A. Lee (4–1)  ||K. Overstreet (0–1) || None || 1,845  || 28–12 || 12–6 
|- align="center" bgcolor="#ffdddd"
|April 22 |||| No. 8 || Sewell-Thomas Stadium || L 3–6 || C. Giannini (3–2) ||G. Bramblett (3–1) || J. Seddon (11) || 2,852  || 28–13 || -
|- align="center" bgcolor="#ffdddd"
|April 25 ||No. 18 South Carolina || No. 8 || Carolina Stadium || L 3–9 || J. Montgomery (6–3) ||S. Turnbull (5–3) || None || 8,242  || 28–14 || 12–7
|- align="center" bgcolor="#ddffdd"
|April 26 ||No. 18 South Carolina|| No. 8 || Carolina Stadium || W 2–1 || J. Kamplain (4–2) ||J. Wynkoop (5–3) || T. Burrows (9) || 8,242 || 29–14 || 13–7
|- align="center" bgcolor="#ffdddd"
|April 27 ||No. 18 South Carolina || No. 8 || Carolina Stadium|| L 3–9 || C. Mincey (4–0) ||N. Eicholtz (2–1) || J. Seddon(12) || 8,074  || 29–15 || 13–8
|- align="center" bgcolor="#ddffdd"
|April 30 || || No. 16 || Joe Lee Griffin Stadium|| W 9–5 ||  G. Bramblett (4–1) || C. Pugh (3–4)|| None|| 1,927  || 30–15 || –
|-

|- align="center" bgcolor="#ffdddd"
|May 2 || No. 8 Florida|| No. 16 || Sewell-Thomas Stadium|| L 3–7 ||  L. Shore (6–2)|| S. Turnbull (5–4)|| E. Hanhold (3) || 4,103 || 30–16 || 13-9
|- align="center" bgcolor="#ffdddd"
|May 3 || No. 8 Florida || No. 16 || Sewell-Thomas Stadium|| L 3–4 || A. Puk (4–2) || J. Kamplain (5–3) || R. Harris (5) || 4,191 || 30–17 || 13–10
|- align="center" bgcolor="#ffdddd"
|May 4 || No. 8 Florida|| No. 16 || Sewell-Thomas Stadium|| L 3–13 || K. Snead (2–0) || J. Keller (5–2) || None || 3,662 || 30–18 || 13–11
|- align="center" bgcolor="#ddffdd"
|May 6 ||  || No. 20 || Sewell-Thomas Stadium  || W 6–1 || N. Eicholtz (3–1) || A. Polk (4–3)|| T. Hawley (1)|| 2,820 || 31–18 || –
|- align="center" bgcolor="#ffdddd"
|May 10 || No. 15  || No. 20 || Alex Box Stadium || L 0–2 || A. Nola (8–1) ||S. Turnbull (5–5) || None || 11,163  || 31–19 || 13–12
|- align="center" bgcolor="#ddffdd"
|May 10 || No. 15 LSU || No. 20 || Alex Box Stadium || W 5–1 || J. Kamplain (5–3) || A. Cartwright (1–1)|| None || 11,286  || 32–19 || 14–12
|- align="center" bgcolor="bbbbbb"
|May 11 || No. 15 LSU|| No. 20 || Alex Box Stadium|| colspan=7 |Canceled
|- align="center" bgcolor="#ddffdd"
|May 13 || Jacksonville State|| No. 22 || Rudy Abbott Field || W 15–10 ||  T. Hawley (4–1) || T. Urban (1–3)|| None|| 2,834  || 33–19 || – 
|- align="center" bgcolor="#ffdddd"
|May 15 || No. 16 Mississippi State || No. 22 || Sewell-Thomas Stadium || L 4–2 || J. Lindgren (5–1) ||G. Bramblett (3–1) || M. Gentry (3) || 3,201  ||33–20 || 14–13
|- align="center" bgcolor="#ffdddd"
|May 16 || No. 16 Mississippi State|| No. 22 || Sewell-Thomas Stadium || L 0–1 || R. Mitchell (8–4) ||S. Turnbull (5–6) || J. Holder (7) || 3,647  || 33–21 || 14–14
|- align="center" bgcolor="#ddffdd"
|May 17 || No. 16 Mississippi State|| No. 22 || Sewell-Thomas Stadium|| W 2–1 || J. Kamplain (6–3) ||P. Brown  (4–2) || T. Burrows (10) || 6,142 || 34–22 || 15–14
|-

|-
! style="background:#ffffff;color:#9e1b32;"| Post-Season: 2–3
|-

|- align="center" bgcolor="#ffdddd"
| May 20 || vs. (9) Kentucky || (8) || Hoover Met || L 1–7 || A. Reed (11–2) || N. Eicholtz (3–2) || A. Nelson (1)||8,175 || 34–22 || 0–1
|-

|- align="center" bgcolor="#ffdddd"
| May 30 || (3) No. 27 Kennesaw State || (2) || Dick Howser Stadium || L 0–1 || T. Bergen (7–4) ||S. Turnbull (5–7) || J. McCalvin (15) || 2,798  || 34–23 || 0–1
|- align="center" bgcolor="#ddffdd"
| May 31 || (1) No. 8 Florida State || (2) || Dick Howser Stadium || W 6–5 || J. Kamplain (7–3) || L. Weaver (8–4) || T. Burrows (11) || 3,586  || 35–23 || 1–1
|- align="center" bgcolor="#ddffdd"
| June 1 || (4) Georgia Southern || (2) || Dick Howser Stadium || W 6–0 || G. Bramblett (4–2) || W. Jackson (3–2) || None || 2,923 || 36–23 || 2–1
|- align="center" bgcolor="#ffdddd"
| June 1 || (3) No. 27 Kennesaw State || (2) || Dick Howser Stadium || L 2–4 || T. Bergen (8–4) ||T. Burrows (4–2)|| J. McCalvin (16) || - || 36–24 || 2–2
|-

† Indicates the game does not count toward the 2014 Southeastern Conference standings.
*Rankings are based on the team's current  ranking in the Collegiate Baseball poll the week Alabama faced each opponent.

Honors and awards
 Thomas Burrows was named SEC Freshman of the Week on March 17.
 Jon Keller was named SEC Co-Pitcher of the Week on March 31.
 Hunter Webb was named SEC Freshman of the Week on April 7.
 Justin Kamplain was named SEC Pitcher of the Week on April 14.
 Thomas Burrows was named SEC Freshman of the Week on April 21.

Rankings

See also
 Alabama Crimson Tide baseball
 2014 NCAA Division I baseball season
 2014 Alabama Crimson Tide softball season

References

Alabama Crimson Tide Baseball Team, 2014
Alabama Crimson Tide baseball seasons
Alabama Crimson Tide baseball team
Alabama